Nikolai Bachtin (1894 – 1950) was a lecturer in classics and linguistics at the University of Birmingham, England. Bachtin was a friend of the philosopher Ludwig Wittgenstein.  Bachtin's papers are held at the University of Birgminham archive.

References

Academics of the University of Birmingham
1894 births
1950 deaths